The Man Who Sold the World may refer to:

 The Man Who Sold the World (album), a 1970 album by David Bowie
 "The Man Who Sold the World" (song), the album's title track
 "The Man Who Sold the World" (Life on Mars), 2008 episode of Life on Mars
 "The Man Who Sold the World" (Holby City), 2017 episode of Holby City